The Sri Jayawardenepura Kotte Municipal Council is the local council for Sri Jayawardenepura Kotte, the administrative city of Sri Lanka. The council was first formed as Kotte Urban Development Council which was established in the 1930s and the council became Sri Jayawardenepura Kotte Municipal Council in 1997, Chandra Silva was elected as the first mayor.

Sri Jayawardenepura Kotte Municipal Council area is bounded by the Kolonnawa Urban Council to the North, the Kotikawatta – Mulleriyawa Pradeshiya Sabha to the North East, Kaduwela Municipal Council to the East, Maharagama Urban Council to the South East, Dehiwala-Mount Lavinia Municipal Council to the South West, and Colombo Municipal Council to the West.

Municipal structure  

The Kotte Urban Development Council was created in the 1930s, with a modern building at Rajagiriya. It was succeeded by the Kotte Urban Council, which had a large section of its area removed and tagged onto the Colombo Municipal Council ward of Borella while the Battaramulla urban council was dissolved and a small section of Battaramulla tagged onto the Kotte Urban Council. 
The Kotte Urban Council became the Sri Jayawardenepura Kotte Municipal Council in 1997, with Chandra Silva as the first Mayor.

There are 20 Members of the Municipal Council (MMCs), elected on proportional representation. There are 18 wards, but these are now merely polling divisions, without individual representation.

Zones
Pita Kotte
Ethul Kotte
Nawala
Nugegoda
Rajagiriya

Wards

Grama Niladhari Division

Demographics 
Sri Jayawardenepura Kotte is a multi-ethnic, multi-religious urban centre.  According to the census of 2012 the demographics by ethnicity and religion is as follows:

Representation 
The Sri Jayawardenepura Kotte Municipal Council is divided into 16 wards and is represented by 20 councillors, elected using an open list proportional representation system.

2011 Local government election 
Results of the local government election held on 8 October 2011.

The Sri Jayawardenepura Kotte Municipal Council has six standing departments each headed by the mayor. The standing committees are Accounts Department, Municipal Engineering Department, Health Development, Veterinary Department, Legal Department and Public Utility Department.

Notes

External links 
Sri Jayawardenepura Kotte Municipal Council

References 

Sri Jayawardenepura Kotte
Local authorities in Western Province, Sri Lanka
Municipal councils of Sri Lanka
1997 establishments in Sri Lanka